"The Proposal and the Bear" is a 1968 Australian TV play based on two stories by Anton Chekhov, The Proposal and The Bear. They were filmed in the ABC's Melbourne studios using the same cast for two plays.

Plot
"The Bear" - a woman, although desperate for a husband, fights with her only suitor.
"The Proposal" - a widow is challenged to a duel by a rough farmer

Cast
 Gerda Nicolson
 Terry Norris
 Dennis Olsen

Reception
The Sydney Morning Herald said the show "required goodwill in the viewer to force the fun. It's not what-you do but the "verve with, which you do it — at least, in farce."

References

1968 television plays
1968 Australian television episodes
1960s Australian television plays
Wednesday Theatre (season 4) episodes